Rudolf Nyandoro (born 11 October 1968) is a Zimbabwean Roman Catholic prelate who served as the Bishop of Gokwe since 2017. He was appointed the new Bishop of Gweru in September 2020. A Gweru native, he previously served a parish priest, seminary rector and professor, and most recently, chancellor of the Diocese of Masvingo.

Early life and education 
Nyandoro was born on 11 October 1968 in Gwelo, Rhodesia (today Gweru, Zimbabwe). After primary school, he attended the Minory Seminary of Chikwingwizha. From 1991 to 1994, he studied philosophy at St. Charles Lwanga Major Seminary in Chimanimani in the Diocese of Mutare. He then completed his theological studies at Chishawasha Major Seminary in the Archdiocese of Harare. He holds a BS and MS in Counseling from Zimbabwe Open University. In 2015, he earned his PhD in Pastoral Counseling from the University of South Africa.

Priesthood 
Nyandoro was ordained a priest of the Diocese of Masvingo on 19 December 1998. In 1999, he worked as an assistant priest at the Mukaro mission, before serving from 2000 to 2006 as the rector of Sts. Peter and Paul Cathedral in Masvingo. From 2007 to 2009, he was rector of the diocesan minor seminary. He served as rector of Bondolfi Teachers' College from 2010 to 2015. From 2015 to 2017, he was the Chancellor of the Diocese of Masvingo and a professor at Bondolfi Teachers' College.

Episcopate 
On 28 January 2017, Nyandoro was appointed Bishop of Gokwe by Pope Francis. He was appointed to succeed Bishop Angel Floro Martínez, who resigned on the same day. His episcopal ordination was held on 29 April 2017, on the ground of St. Paul's Primary School in Gokwe. Bishop Michael Dixon Bhasera, President of the Zimbabwe Catholic Bishops' Conference and Bishop of Masvingo, was the principal consecrator. Archbishop Marek Zalewski, Apostolic Nuncio to Zimbabwe, and Angel Floro Martínez, Bishop Emeritus of Gokwe, served as co-consecrators. In addition to bishops and clergy, the ordination ceremony was attended by thousands of laity. Congratulatory remarks were delivered by Archbishop Zalewski and Robert Ndlovu, Archbishop of Harare.

Episcopal lineage 
The following is Nyandoro's episcopal lineage:

 Cardinal Scipione Rebiba
 Cardinal Giulio Antonio Santorio (1566)
 Cardinal Girolamo Bernerio, OP (1586)
 Archbishop Galeazzo Sanvitale (1604)
 Cardinal Ludovico Ludovisi (1621)
 Cardinal Luigi Caetani (1622)
 Cardinal Ulderico Carpegna (1630)
 Cardinal Paluzzo Paluzzi Altieri Degli Albertoni (1666)
 Pope Benedict XIII (1675)
 Pope Benedict XIV (1724)
 Pope Clement XIII (1743)
 Cardinal Marcantonio Colonna (1762)
 Cardinal Hyacinthe Sigismond Gerdil, CRSP (1777)
 Cardinal Giulio Maria della Somaglia (1788)
 Cardinal Carlo Odescalchi, SJ (1823)
 Cardinal Costantino Patrizi Naro (1828)
 Cardinal Lucido Parocchi (1871)
 Pope Pius X (1884)
 Pope Benedict XV (1907)
 Cardinal Willem Marinus van Rossum, CSsR (1918)
 Archbishop Bernhard Gijlswijk, OP (1922)
 Bishop Aston Chichester, SJ (1931)
 Bishop Aloysius Haene, SMB (1950)
 Bishop Francis Xavier Mugadzi (1989)
 Bishop Michael Dixon Bhasera (1991)
 Bishop Rudolf Nyandoro (2017)

References 

1968 births
21st-century Roman Catholic bishops in Zimbabwe
Bishops appointed by Pope Francis
Chishawasha Seminary alumni
People from Gweru
Shona people
University of South Africa alumni
Zimbabwean educators
Zimbabwe Open University alumni
Living people
Roman Catholic bishops of Gweru
Roman Catholic bishops of Gokwe